Emra Tahirović (born 31 July 1987) is a Swedish footballer of Bosnian origin who plays as a striker for Pålsboda GOIF. Tahirović has played in the top divisions of Swedish, French and Swiss football.

Early life 
Tahirović was born in Sarajevo but fled to Sweden upon the outbreak of the Bosnian War. He was raised in Örebro, Sweden.

Club career 
Tahirović started to play for local club IK Sturehov and at the age of 14 moved to Örebro SK. After failing to become a "starting eleven" player he moved to Halmstads BK in 2006. Prior to signing with HBK he had been on trial with his future club FC Zürich and also Werder Bremen, but wanted to continue his development in the Swedish Allsvenskan before joining the larger European clubs. During his tenure with HBK he played maily as a substitute. .

In 2007, he drew the attention of Lille OSC in the French Ligue 1 and was later signed for 15 million SEK. After playing only two matches with the club, he was loaned to Swiss side FC Zurich in January 2008 for the remainder of the season. At the end of the season he signed permanently for FC Zurich.

In 2009, he went on loan back to Örebro SK in Allsvenskan and turned back in December 2009 to FC Zürich. In January 2010 Tahirović left the Swiss club again and signed a half year loan deal with MVV Maastricht.

References

External links
  
 
 
 Profile – FC Zürich

1987 births
Living people
Footballers from Sarajevo
Swedish people of Bosnia and Herzegovina descent
Bosnia and Herzegovina emigrants to Sweden
Yugoslav Wars refugees
Association football forwards
Bosnia and Herzegovina footballers
Swedish footballers
Sweden under-21 international footballers
Örebro SK players
Halmstads BK players
Lille OSC players
FC Zürich players
MVV Maastricht players
CD Castellón footballers
FC Wil players
Allsvenskan players
Ligue 1 players
Swiss Super League players
Eerste Divisie players
Segunda División B players
Swiss Challenge League players
Swedish expatriate footballers
Expatriate footballers in France
Swedish expatriate sportspeople in France
Expatriate footballers in Switzerland
Swedish expatriate sportspeople in Switzerland
Expatriate footballers in the Netherlands
Swedish expatriate sportspeople in the Netherlands
Expatriate footballers in Spain
Swedish expatriate sportspeople in Spain